Verkhneye Makarovo is a rural locality (a village) in Verkhovazhskoye Rural Settlement, Verkhovazhsky District, Vologda Oblast, Russia. The population was 15 as of 2002.

Geography 
Verkhneye Makarovo is located 6 km northeast of Verkhovazhye (the district's administrative centre) by road. Filinskaya is the nearest rural locality.

References 

Rural localities in Verkhovazhsky District